Valakam, also known as Valakom is a village in the Ernakulam district of Kerala, India. The National Highway 85 passes through Valakom.

Demographics 

According to the 2011 census of India, Valakam has 4012 households. The literacy rate of the village is 88.57%.

Location

Places of worship 
 Christian Brethren Church, Valakom
 St. George church, Valakom
 Marthoma Church, Valakom
 Ambaloor Mahadeva temple. Mekkadampu, valakom
 IPC Hebron church Valakom
 St. Marys Church,Rackad.

Education 
 MS High School Valakom
 Govt. lower primary school Valakom
 MIN Public School Mekkadampu
 Bright Public School Valakom

References 

Villages in Ernakulam district